A tuffet is a small grassy mound or clump of grass; or alternatively a low seat.

The word is now known overwhelmingly from the nursery rhyme "Little Miss Muffet" which was first printed in 1805. It was originally a variant of the word "tuft" (e.g. of leaves or flowers), a usage which dates back at least to the 16th century. In the context of the nursery rhyme, the word may refer to a grassy hillock, a small knoll or mound. Perhaps due to misunderstanding of the rhyme, the word has also come to mean a low seat.

Uncertain meaning
Since the rhyme provides little context, several writers have expressed confusion about its meaning. In 1902, Samuel M. Crothers remarked, "Perhaps some of you would like to know what a tuffet is. I have thought of that myself, and have taken the trouble to ask several learned persons. They assure me that the most complete and satisfactory definition is,—a tuffet is the kind of thing that Miss Muffet sat on."

As a grassy mound

According to the Oxford English Dictionary the word in the nursery rhyme may refer to "a grassy hillock, a small knoll or mound".

Recorded examples of "tuffet" with the related meaning "tuft" (for example a cluster of short-stalked leaves or flowers growing from a common point) date back to 1553. Merriam-Webster suggests that the word derives from the Anglo-French , from "tufe", meaning "tuft".

Many illustrators have shown Miss Muffet sitting on a mound or hillock, including John Everett Millais (1884) and Arthur Rackham (1913).

As a low seat

The Oxford English Dictionary gives a secondary definition "hassock or footstool", but calls this "doubtful". It lists an example from 1895 in which the meaning is "a three-legged stool" and another from 1904 with the meaning "footstool".  Some sources, including Brewer's Dictionary of Phrase and Fable (1898) and Chambers 20th Century Dictionary (1983), failed to recognise this meaning at all, and listed only the grassy knoll definition. Nevertheless, there is a long tradition of illustrators showing some sort of low seat, including Kate Greenaway (1900) and Frederick Richardson (1915).

An 1888 variant of the rhyme has "she sat on a buffet" which the scholars Iona and Peter Opie point out certainly refers to a stool.

Many modern dictionaries including Collins, Merriam-Webster, Chambers 21st Century Dictionary and Oxford Dictionaries give both meanings.

References

Landforms
Seats